Colonel (Col) (öv) is the most senior field grade military officer rank in the Swedish Army and the Swedish Air Force, immediately above the rank of lieutenant colonel and just below the rank of brigadier general. It is equivalent to the naval rank of captain in the Swedish Navy.

History
Överste ("Colonel") is the name for the highest regimental officer rank. The name, sometimes in the connection with häröverste ("army colonel") and also generalöverste ("colonel general"), is as old as a standing army, that is, from the end of the Middle Ages. During the 16th and 17th centuries, a famous soldier was commissioned to recruit a regiment and was then appointed colonel at the head of it. The regiment was thus the colonel's belonging; he appointed, among other things, its officers. To the extent that the recruitment was immediately taken over by the state, the colonels began to be appointed by the king as well as the other officers. Even today, the colonel is usually the regimental commander.

The rank of colonel was between the rank of lieutenant colonel and major general until 1972 when senior colonel rank was introduced. Thereafter, colonel was between lieutenant colonel and senior colonel from 1972 to 2000 when the brigadier general rank was introduced. Since 2000, the rank of colonel is between the lieutenant colonel and the brigadier general and the senior colonel (for those who still hold the rank, no new appointments are made) is between colonel and the brigadier general.

Rank insignia

Collar patches

Shoulder marks

Air Force

Army

Navy (Amphibious Corps)

Sleeve insignias

Air Force

Army

Navy (Amphibious Corps)

Hats

References

Notes

Print

Military ranks of the Swedish Army
Military ranks of the Swedish Air Force

sv:Överste